Cardiobacterium valvarum is a Gram-negative bacteria of the Cardiobacterium genus that can cause infective endocarditis. They belong to the HACEK group of fastidious bacteria that are present in normal oropharyngeal flora that can develop into infective endocarditis.

Microbiology 
The only other identified Cardiobacterium species is Cardiobacterium hominis. Cardiobacterium species are pleomorphic Gram-negative bacteria rod-shaped bacteria that are catalase-negative and oxidase-positive.  When compared morphologically, the two Cardiobacterium species are indistinguishable in culture and Gram stain, however, differ in growth patterns. C.valvarum is more fastidious than C. hominis, and are non-hemolytic. C.valvarum is also differentiated by the fact that they do not produce indole.

Isolates of C. valvarum show optimal growth by day 3 under standard 5%  incubation conditions on 5% sheep blood but scant growth on chocolate agar.

Identification 
Members of the HACEK group are difficult to identify through conventional methods. 16S ribosomal RNA genotyping is the necessary method of identifying C.valvarum. C.valvarum bears numerous phenotypic similarities with Pasteurella multocida and is frequently misidentified. The phenylphosphonate reaction and MALDI-TOF mass spectrometry can be used to distinguish the two species.

The Cardiobacterium species are broadly susceptible to beta-lactam, trimethoprim-sulfamethoxazole, fluoroquinolones, and aztreonam. Current clinical guidelines recommend that C.valvarum infection be treated with a 4-week course of ceftriaxone or ciprofloxacin.

References 

Gammaproteobacteria